A non sequitur ("[it] does not follow") is a conversational literary device, often used for comedic purposes. It is something said that, because of its apparent lack of meaning relative to what preceded it, seems absurd to the point of being humorous or confusing. This use of the term is distinct from the non sequitur in logic, where it is a fallacy.

Etymology
The expression is Latin for "[it] does not follow". It comes from the words non meaning "not" and the verb sequi meaning "to follow".

Usage
A non sequitur can denote an abrupt, illogical, or unexpected turn in plot or dialogue by including a relatively inappropriate change in manner. A non sequitur joke sincerely has no explanation, but it reflects the idiosyncrasies, mental frames and alternative world of the particular comic persona.

Comic artist Gary Larson's The Far Side cartoons are known for what Larson calls "...absurd, almost non sequitur animal" characters, such as talking cows, which he uses to create a "...weird, zany, ...bizarre, odd, strange" effect; in one strip, "two cows in a field gaze toward burning Chicago, saying 'It seems that agent 6373 had accomplished her mission.'"

See also
 Anacoluthon
 Anti-humor
 Dada
 Derailment (thought disorder)
 "Good day, fellow!" "Axe handle!"
 Gibberish
 Roger Irrelevant
 Surreal humour

More readings 

 The Koan: Texts and Contexts in Zen Buddhism. United Kingdom, Oxford University Press, 2000.
 Shabo, Magedah. Rhetoric, Logic, and Argumentation: A Guide for Student Writers. United States, Prestwick House, 2010.

References

External links

 Getting It: Human Event-Related Brain Response to Jokes in Good and Poor Comprehenders - "When asked to pick the punch-line of a joke from an array of choices, including straightforward endings, non sequitur endings, and the correct punch-line, RHD patients erred by picking non sequitur endings, indicating that they know surprise is necessary"

Humour
Latin literary phrases
Narratology
Jokes